Glacies is a genus of moths in the family Geometridae erected by Pierre Millière in 1874.

Species
 Glacies alpinata (Scopoli, 1763)
 Glacies alticolaria (Mann, 1853)
 Glacies baldensis (Wolfsberger, 1966)
 Glacies bentelii (Rätzer, 1890)
 Glacies burmanni (Tarmann, 1984)
 Glacies canaliculata (Hochenwarth, 1785)
 Glacies coracina (Esper, 1805)
 Glacies noricana (Wagner, 1898)
 Glacies perlinii (Turati, 1915)
 Glacies spitzi (Rebel, 1906)
 Glacies wehrlii (Vorbrodt, 1918)

References

Gnophini